Zmeinogorsk is a town and the administrative center of Zmeinogorsky District of Altai Krai, Russia, located on the Korbolikha (the Aley's tributary) and Zmeyevka Rivers. Population:

History
It was founded in 1736 and granted town status in 1952.

Geography

Climate

Administrative and municipal status
Within the framework of administrative divisions, Zmeinogorsk serves as the administrative center of Zmeinogorsky District. As an administrative division, it is, together with the selo of Lazurka, incorporated within Zmeinogorsky District as the town of district significance of Zmeinogorsk. As a municipal division, the town of district significance of Zmeinogorsk is incorporated within Zmeinogorsky Municipal District as Zmeinogorsk Urban Settlement.

References

Notes

Sources

External links

Official website of Zmeinogorsk 
Zmeinogorsk Business Directory  

Cities and towns in Altai Krai
Tomsk Governorate
Populated places established in 1736